An Earth observation satellite or Earth remote sensing satellite is a satellite used or designed for Earth observation (EO) from orbit, including spy satellites and similar ones intended for non-military uses such as environmental monitoring, meteorology, cartography and others. The most common type are Earth imaging satellites, that take satellite images, analogous to aerial photographs; some EO satellites may perform remote sensing without forming pictures, such as in GNSS radio occultation.

The first occurrence of satellite remote sensing can be dated to the launch of the first artificial satellite, Sputnik 1, by the Soviet Union on October 4, 1957. Sputnik 1 sent back radio signals, which scientists used to study the ionosphere.
The United States Army Ballistic Missile Agency launched the first American satellite, Explorer 1, for NASA's Jet Propulsion Laboratory on January 31, 1958. The information sent back from its radiation detector led to the discovery of the Earth's Van Allen radiation belts. The TIROS-1 spacecraft, launched on April 1, 1960, as part of NASA's Television Infrared Observation Satellite (TIROS) program, sent back the first television footage of weather patterns to be taken from space.

In 2008, more than 150 Earth observation satellites were in orbit, recording data with both passive and active sensors and acquiring more than 10 terabits of data daily. By 2021, that total had grown to over 950, with the largest number of satellites operated by US-based company Planet Labs.

Most Earth observation satellites carry instruments that should be operated at a relatively low altitude. Most orbit at altitudes above . Lower orbits have significant air-drag, which makes frequent orbit reboost maneuvers necessary. The Earth observation satellites of UAE, DubaiSat-1 & DubaiSat-2 are also placed in Low Earth Orbits (LEO) orbits and providing satellite imagery of various parts of the Earth.

To get (nearly) global coverage with a low orbit, a polar orbit is used. A low orbit will have an orbital period of roughly 100 minutes and the Earth will rotate around its polar axis about 25° between successive orbits. The ground track moves towards the west 25° each orbit, allowing a different section of the globe to be scanned with each orbit. Most are in Sun-synchronous orbits.

This allows uninterrupted coverage of more than 1/3 of the Earth per satellite, so three satellites, spaced 120° apart, can cover the whole Earth except the extreme polar regions. This type of orbit is mainly used for meteorological satellites.

History 

Herman Potočnik explored the idea of using orbiting spacecraft for detailed peaceful and military observation of the ground in his 1928 book, The Problem of Space Travel. He described how the special conditions of space could be useful for scientific experiments. The book described geostationary satellites (first put forward by Konstantin Tsiolkovsky) and discussed communication between them and the ground using radio, but fell short of the idea of using satellites for mass broadcasting and as telecommunications relays.

Applications

Weather 

A weather satellite is a type of satellite that is primarily used to monitor the weather and climate of the Earth. These meteorological satellites, however, see more than clouds and cloud systems. City lights, fires, effects of pollution, auroras, sand and dust storms, snow cover, ice mapping, boundaries of ocean currents, energy flows, etc., are other types of environmental information collected using weather satellites.

Weather satellite images helped in monitoring the volcanic ash cloud from Mount St. Helens and activity from other volcanoes such as Mount Etna. Smoke from fires in the western United States such as Colorado and Utah have also been monitored.

Environmental monitoring 

Other environmental satellites can assist environmental monitoring by detecting changes in the Earth's vegetation, atmospheric trace gas content, sea state, ocean color, and ice fields. By monitoring vegetation changes over time, droughts can be monitored by comparing the current vegetation state to its long term average. For example, the 2002 oil spill off the northwest coast of Spain was watched carefully by the European ENVISAT, which, though not a weather satellite, flies an instrument (ASAR) which can see changes in the sea surface. Anthropogenic emissions can be monitored by evaluating data of tropospheric NO2 and SO2.

These types of satellites are almost always in Sun-synchronous and "frozen" orbits. A sun-synchronous orbit passes over each spot on the ground at the same time of day, so that observations from each pass can be more easily compared, since the sun is in the same spot in each observation. A "frozen" orbit is the closest possible orbit to a circular orbit that is undisturbed by the oblateness of the Earth, gravitational attraction from the sun and moon, solar radiation pressure, and air drag.

Mapping 
Terrain can be mapped from space with the use of satellites, such as Radarsat-1 and TerraSAR-X.

International regulations

According to the International Telecommunication Union (ITU), Earth exploration-satellite service (also: Earth exploration-satellite radiocommunication service) is – according to Article 1.51 of the ITU Radio Regulations (RR) – defined as:
A radiocommunication service between earth stations and one or more space stations, which may include links between space stations, in which:
information relating to the characteristics of the Earth and its natural phenomena, including data relating to the state of the environment, is obtained from passive or active sensors on satellites; 
similar information is collected from airborne or Earth-based platforms;
such information may be distributed to earth stations within the system concerned;
platform interrogation may be included.
This service may also include feeder links necessary for its operation.

Classification
This radiocommunication service is classified in accordance with ITU Radio Regulations (article 1) as follows: 
Fixed service (article 1.20)
Fixed-satellite service (article 1.21)
Inter-satellite service (article 1.22)
Earth exploration-satellite service
Meteorological-satellite service (article 1.52)

Frequency allocation
The allocation of radio frequencies is provided according to Article 5 of the ITU Radio Regulations (edition 2012).

In order to improve harmonisation in spectrum utilisation, the majority of service-allocations stipulated in this document were incorporated in national Tables of Frequency Allocations and Utilisations which is with-in the responsibility of the appropriate national administration. The allocation might be primary, secondary, exclusive, and shared.
primary allocation:  is indicated by writing in capital letters (see example below)
secondary allocation: is indicated by small letters
exclusive or shared utilization: is within the responsibility of administrations 
However, military usage, in bands where there is civil usage, will be in accordance with the ITU Radio Regulations.

 Example of frequency allocation

See also 

 Committee on Earth Observation Satellites
 Data collection satellite
 Earth observation
 Earth observation satellites transmission frequencies
 Earth Observing System - a NASA program comprising a series of satellite missions
 First images of Earth from space
 Imaging satellites
 List of Earth observation satellites
 Space telescope
 Satellite imagery
GNSS radio occultation
Microwave radiometer#Spaceborne
Radar earth observation satellite
Radar imaging
Synthetic-aperture radar
Interferometric synthetic-aperture radar
Satellite altimetry

References

External links 
 EO Portal directory 
 The TIROS I and II Ground Control Station where the first Earth Observing Satellite (TIROS I) sent it first photos

 
Satellites by type
Satellite imagery